Apollinarie Nyinawabéra (born 1962) is a Rwandan long-distance runner. She competed in the women's marathon at the 1988 Summer Olympics.

References

1962 births
Living people
Athletes (track and field) at the 1988 Summer Olympics
Rwandan female long-distance runners
Rwandan female marathon runners
Olympic athletes of Rwanda
Place of birth missing (living people)